Lucretia refers to one of three paintings by Artemisia Gentileschi:

 Lucretia (Artemisia Gentileschi, Los Angeles), Getty Museum
 Lucretia (Artemisia Gentileschi, Milan), private collection
 Lucretia (Artemisia Gentileschi, Potsdam), Neues Palais

Paintings by Artemisia Gentileschi
Gentileschi